Katse Airport  is an airport serving the  Katse Dam section of the Lesotho Highlands Water Project in north-central Lesotho.

The high elevation runway has a  overrun on the south end, and a steep dropoff to the Malibamatso River on the north end. Some sections of the runway are built on rock fill and have no shoulder. There are hills and ravines in all quadrants.

See also

Transport in Lesotho
List of airports in Lesotho

References

External links
OpenStreetMap - Katse
Katse Airport - FallingRain
OurAirports - Katse

 Google Earth

Airports in Lesotho